Port of Sillamäe (port code EE SLM) is the second largest commercial port in Estonia.

Overview  
Port of Sillamäe is a universal port capable of handling all types of cargo, including liquid, bulk, general cargo, container, ro-ro and project cargo, as well as serve the passengers.

The port is located on the shores of Narva Bay at coordinates . The depth in the port reaches from 13 meters (BK77) to 16.5 meters (BK77). This allows the port to receive and service all vessels that are able to pass through the Danish straits.

The sea channel is a semi-restricted (dredged in shallow water) single-line channel classified as Group A Channel – supplied with day and night navigational aids as well as providing guaranteed depths of 16,5 m (BK77).

Ice conditions in the port are favorable for all-year-round navigation and no ice breaking is needed in an average winter.

Operations 

The port opened for navigation in 2005, has 15 berths with a total length of 3 km, as well as its own railway station with a total length of railroads more than 30 km. Tracks gauge is 1520 mm.

There are four terminals in the port: 
 Alexela Sillamäe - dark oil products and shale oil; 
 DBT - liquid mineral fertilizers; 
 Silsteve - containers, general, bulk and project cargoes, ro-ro cargoes; 
 EuroChem Terminal Sillamäe - liquid chemical products.

The port is powered by Silpower's own heat and power station.

The landlord type of port with 750-hectares has created in the Sillamäe Free Zone Area an Industrial Park with 69 different enterprises, which together form a cluster of the port of Sillamäe.

The port has an international ISPS security certificate.

The port's cargo turnover is about 10 million tons (2019).

External links

Official site of the Port of Sillamäe

Sillamäe
Sillamäe
Sillamäe